Abu Hubaida (born 10 July 1994) is an Indian professional para-badminton player. He made his international debut in 2016. He won his 1st international title for his country when he won a gold & a bronze medal in Uganda Para-Badminton International in 2017. He became national champion of men's singles in 2018 by beating former national champion Sanjeev Kumar. 

He is currently the national champion in men's doubles with his doubles partner Prem Kumar Ale. He and his partner are also ranked 6th in men's doubles and he is ranked 16th in men's singles on the Badminton World Federation Para-Badminton World Ranking. 

He received LAXMAN AWARD, which is the highest sport honor of Uttar Pradesh from Chief Minister Shri Yogi Adityanath on 24 January 2021.

Awards 

 Abu Hubaida was awarded with the Laxman Award (highest Sport Honor of uttar Pradesh Government) on 24 January 2021 from  Uttar Pradesh Honorable Chief Minister Shri Yogi Adityanath. 
 Abu Hubaida was awarded with the Lokmat Samman on 10 June 2017 from  Uttar Pradesh Honorable Chief Minister Shri Yogi Adityanath.
 Abu Hubaida was honored as the outstanding Divyang player on 3 December 2016 by the Divyangjan Empowerment Uttar Pradesh.

Achievements

BWF Para Badminton World Circuit (1 runner-up) 
The BWF Para Badminton World Circuit – Grade 2, Level 1, 2 and 3 tournaments has been sanctioned by the Badminton World Federation from 2022.

Men's doubles

International Tournaments (2 titles, 5 runners-up) 
Men's singles

Men's doubles

Mixed doubles

References

Notes 

Living people
1994 births
Indian male para-badminton players